Paulauskas is the masculine form of a Lithuanian family name.  Of Slavic origin; Polish counterpart: Pawlowski, Russian and Ukrainian: Pavlovsky. Its feminine forms  are: Paulauskienė (married woman or widow) and Paulauskaitė (unmarried woman).

The surname may refer to:

Modestas Paulauskas (born 1945), Lithuanian basketball player
Artūras Paulauskas (born 1953), Lithuanian Lawyer and politician, the Speaker of Seimas
Gediminas Paulauskas (born 1982), Lithuanian footballer (Vetra Vilnius)

Lithuanian-language surnames